Lily Forbath was a female Austrian international table tennis player.

She won a bronze medal at the 1931 World Table Tennis Championships in the women's doubles with Helly Reitzer.

See also
 List of table tennis players
 List of World Table Tennis Championships medalists

References

Austrian female table tennis players
World Table Tennis Championships medalists